John Marion may refer to:
 John L. Marion, American auctioneer and philanthropist
 John Hardin Marion, associate justice of the South Carolina Supreme Court